Rakesh Deewana ( – 27 April 2014) was an Indian character actor from Hathras, Uttar Pradesh. He died on the morning of 27 April 2014 due to illness caused after undergoing bariatric surgery in Indore.

Filmography

Films
Ya Rab (2014)
Hello Hum Lallann Bol Rahe Hain (2010)
Baabarr as Nanha (2009)
Manoranjan: The Entertainment (2006)

Television
Ramayan as Kumbhkarna (2008)
Yeh Rishta Kya Kehlata Hai as Maharaj (2009-2014)
Taarak Mehta Ka Ooltah Chashmah as Vanraj Hathi (2008 -2014)
Devon Ke Dev...Mahadev as Kuber (2013)

References

External links
 

Indian male film actors
Indian male television actors
Date of birth missing
1969 births
2014 deaths
People from Hathras
21st-century Indian male actors